Del Monte Motor Works, Inc. (DMMW), also known as Del Monte Motors, is a bus and truck manufacturer, headquarters in Quezon City, Philippines. It was established in 1950. The company offers a range of truck and bus bodies for its all major brands. It is also one of the leading bus body manufacturers in the Philippines, other including Santarosa Motor Works; Almazora Motors Corporation; and Hino Motors Philippines.

History 
In 1950, it started manufacturing bus and truck bodies mounted on leading US brands, being International Harvester, Ford, Chevrolet, and the Dodge Chassis. Also, in the 1950s, its sister company, the Emcos Development & Supply Co., Inc. was the leading distributor of International Harvester Macleod, Inc. in Northern Luzon marketing bus chassis, trucks, tractors, agricultural and farm implements.

At present, it is solely responsible for the introduction of Volvo articulated and bi-articulated buses in the Philippines. Philtrak, Volvo, and Del Monte have signed a supply and transfer of technology agreement wherein Volvo will supply its products, mainly the articulated and the bi-articulated bus chassis, and Del Monte will manufacture and assemble the bus body and deliver the finished bus product to Philtrak. Volvo agreed to transfer its technology in the assembly of its articulated and bi-articulated bus chassis to Philtrak and Del Monte jointly constituting a tri-partite agreement among the aforestated parties. Together, they intend to introduce the system not only in Metro Manila but all over the Philippines where the need arises especially on traffic clogged areas.

It is also responsible in re-activating the sale of Isuzu buses in the Philippines when the combined resources of General Motors Corporation, the Yutivo group and its local subsidiary  folded up in the middle 1980s by importing directly from the factory of Japan's Isuzu and supplying different bus operators. It is still authorized to import bus and truck chassis on CBU basis and packaging it with the bus or truck body manufactured from its plant. In October 2010, the chairman and owner Narciso O. Morales created a bus company called Del Monte Land Transport Bus Company (DLTBCO). Their buses are also made from the company with High Class Greyhound facilities.

Facilities 
It has four existing plants and facilities in the Philippines. Two of them are located in Quezon City the third one at Sto. Tomas, Pampanga and the fourth one at Caloocan. It has a tested capacity of a minimum of sixty units of bus and truck bodies a month. It has supplied the majority of bus bodies for the government-owned corporations like the Metro Manila Transit Corporation and the PNR (Phil. National Railways) Motor Service. Before the introduction of these articulated buses, Del Monte has pioneered in the manufactured of bus trailers with a capacity of 200 passengers which were operated by MMTC in EDSA and by a private bus operator in the long stretch Marcos Highway. It was also involved in the assembly and rehabilitation of the British Leyland double deckers used to be operated by the same MMTC.

Products

 Lion's Star
 Euro Bus
 Aero Adamant
 Aero Xtreme
 Series I – uses headlamps from a Golden Dragon XML6796
 Series II – uses headlamps from a Yutong ZK6116D
 "DM" Series
DMAT – Midibus - Uses tail lamps from a 2013 Model Hyundai Super Aero City/Aero City/Unicity
 DM09
 DM10 Series
 Series I – uses headlamps from a Hyundai Universe and LED tail lamps
 Series II – uses headlamps and tail lamps from a 2008 model Kia Granbird
 DM11 - uses headlamps of a Golden Dragon Superstar
 DM12 Series
 Series I – uses headlamps of 2008 model Kia Granbird
 Series II – uses headlamps of a Golden Dragon Superstar
 DM14 Series
 Series I – with Kinglong XMQ6129Y fascia (Front and Rear) and Golden Dragon "Marcopolo" Side
 Series II – with Kinglong XMQ6117Y/Y3 fascia (Front and Rear) and Golden Dragon "Marcopolo" Side
 Series III – replica of Daewoo FX with Golden Dragon Superstar Headlamps and Hyundai Universe Tail Lamps
 DM16 series
 Series I – with Setra Comfort Class front fascia and King Long XMQ6125Y headlights, taillights and rear fascia.
 Mini Bus – with Golden Dragon Triumph headlamps and Toyota Avanza grills.
 Series II – with Volvo 9800 front fascia.
 DM18 - uses MAN Lion's Coach Front Fascia
 Golden Dragon XML6127 Marcopolo Clone / Replica (exclusively custom made for GV Florida Transport & uses Daewoo, Hino, Hyundai, Kia Granbird & MAN R39 18.350 HOCL chassis)
 DM22 - Facelifted with Scania Touring

See also
 List of bus companies of the Philippines

References
Official website
Del Monte Motor Works at Flickr

Bus manufacturers of the Philippines
Truck manufacturers of the Philippines
Companies based in Quezon City
Philippine brands